John Gardener may refer to:

John Gardener (died 1402), MP for New Romney
John Gardener (MP for Melcombe Regis), in 1417, MP for Melcombe Regis
John Gardener (diplomat) (1897–1985), British diplomat

See also
John Gardiner (disambiguation)
John Gardner (disambiguation)